Harald Halvorsen may refer to:
 Harald Halvorsen (gymnast)
 Harald Halvorsen (footballer)
 Harald Halvorsen (musician)
 Harald Halvorsen (politician)